Exaeretina is a genus of flies in the family Stratiomyidae.

Species
Exaeretina auricoma Enderlein, 1921

References

Stratiomyidae
Brachycera genera
Taxa named by Günther Enderlein
Diptera of South America